Ekk Albela is a 2016 Indian Marathi language Biopic film, directed by Shekhar Sartandel and produced by Dr Monish Babre under the Kimaya Motion Pictures banner and presented by Manglmurti Films. The movie is biopic on the life of legendary actor Bhagwan Abaji Palav popularly known as Bhagwan Dada The film released on 24 June 2016 and will be the first ever Marathi film simultaneously released in India and UK. It will also be released globally.

This is also the first Marathi film in the UK to receive a BBFC rating.

The film stars Mangesh Desai  in lead role as Bhagwan Dada and Vidya Balan in cameo role as Geeta Bali. The supporting cast features Vidhyadhar Joshi, Prasad Pandit, Swapnil Rajshekhar, Vighnesh Joshi, Shekhar Phadke, Shriram Kolhatkar and Arun Bhadsavle.

Plot 
The journey of Bhagwan Dada. A common man who rose to the top and became a legend in Indian Cinema.

Cast 
Mangesh Desai as Bhagwan Dada
Vidya Balan as Geeta Bali (cameo)
Vidhyadhar Joshi
Herman Dsouza as Distributor Mr Punjwani
Vaibhavi Shandilya as Shaheen
Prasad Pandit 
Swapnil Rajshekhar
Vighnesh Joshi
Shahnawaz Pradhan 
Tejaswi Patil
Nehaa Patil
Shriram Kolhatkar
Arun Bhadsavle
Riyaaz Mulani

Mannveer Choudharry as Rafiq

References

External links
 

2010s Marathi-language films
2016 films
Indian biographical films
Films about Bollywood
Cultural depictions of actors
Films about actors
2010s biographical films